BDG may refer to:

Bandung, city in Indonesia
Bloc Démocratique Gabonais, a Gabonese political party (from 1953 to 1968)
Blackmar–Diemer Gambit, a chess opening
Blanding Municipal Airport (IATA code)
Bonggi language (ISO 639-3 code)
Bustle Digital Group, a media company
Bydgoszcz, city in Poland